Baccharis hieronymi is a species of flowering plant in the family Asteraceae. It is found only in Ecuador. It grows in subtropical or tropical moist montane forests and subtropical or tropical high-altitude shrubland. It is threatened by habitat loss.

References

hieronymi
Endemic flora of Ecuador
Vulnerable plants
Plants described in 1901
Taxonomy articles created by Polbot